Gianluca Tiberti (born 24 April 1967) is an Italian former modern pentathlete who competed at the 1988 Summer Olympics and at the 1992 Summer Olympics. He won a silver medal in the team event in 1988 and a bronze in the same event in 1992.

References

External links
 
 

1967 births
Living people
Italian male modern pentathletes
Olympic modern pentathletes of Italy
Modern pentathletes at the 1988 Summer Olympics
Modern pentathletes at the 1992 Summer Olympics
Olympic silver medalists for Italy
Olympic bronze medalists for Italy
Olympic medalists in modern pentathlon
Medalists at the 1992 Summer Olympics
Medalists at the 1988 Summer Olympics
20th-century Italian people